Steinkjer is a municipality in Trøndelag county, Norway. It is part of the Innherad region. The administrative centre of the municipality is the town of Steinkjer which is located on the inner part of the Trondheimsfjord. The town is also the administrative centre for Trøndelag county. Other populated areas in Steinkjer include the villages of Ogndal, Hyllbrua, Gaulstad, Beitstad, Bartnes, Vellamelen, Stod, Binde, Sunnan, Byafossen, Følling, Kvam, Lerkehaug, Mære, Sparbu, Vassaunet, Vekre, Malm, Follafoss, Sela, and Verrastranda.

The  municipality is the 31st largest by area out of the 356 municipalities in Norway. Steinkjer is the 53rd most populous municipality in Norway with a population of 24,004.

General information

The village of Steinkjer in the municipality of Stod was declared a kjøpstad (town) in 1857, and then on 23 January 1858 it was separated from Stod to form a municipality of its own. The initial population of Steinkjer was 1,150.

Over time, as the town grew, land was annexed from the neighboring municipalities. It started on 1 January 1902 when an unpopulated area from the neighboring Ogndal municipality was taken for future growth of Steinkjer. Then in 1941, an area (population: 57) was taken from Ogndal to be added to Steinkjer. Again, in 1948, an area (population: 78) was transferred from Ogndal and another area (population: 70) was transferred from Egge municipality.

During the 1960s, there were many municipal mergers across Norway due to the work of the Schei Committee. On 1 January 1964, a large merger took place: the neighboring municipalities of Beitstad (population: 2,563), Egge (population: 3,476), Kvam (population: 1,245), Ogndal (population: 2,678), Sparbu (population: 4,027), and Stod (population: 1,268) were all merged with the town of Steinkjer (population: 4,325) to form the new municipality of Steinkjer.

On 1 January 2018, the municipality joined the rest of the old Nord-Trøndelag county to the newly formed Trøndelag county.

On 1 January 2020, the municipality of Steinkjer and the neighboring municipality of Verran merged to form a new, larger municipality of Steinkjer.

Toponymy
The municipality (originally the town) is named after the old Steinkjer farm since the town was built on the site of the old farm.

Coat of arms

The current coat of arms was approved in October 2018 for use starting on 1 January 2020 after the merger of Steinkjer and Verran municipalities (these arms were previously the arms for Verran from 1987 until 2019). The official blazon is "Azure, a boat with raised square sail and topsail argent". This means the arms have a blue field (background) and the charge is a Veranjekt (boat) with a raised square sail and topsail. The boat has a tincture of argent which means it is commonly colored white, but if it is made out of metal, then silver is used. The design was chosen to symbolize the historical importance of boating and boat-building for the area. The  (literally translated as "a yacht from Verran") is a type of boat has been built in Verran for centuries. The arms were designed by Rolf Tidemann. The municipal flag has the same design as the coat of arms.

The previous coat of arms was originally granted on 8 March 1957 to the town of Steinkjer. Then on 14 March 1964, they were re-granted to the newly enlarged Steinkjer Municipality. They were in use until 1 January 2020 when the municipality was enlarged again and a new coat of arms was put into use. The official blazon was "Azure, a mullet of six argent". This means the arms had a blue field (background) and the charge was a six-pointed star. The star had a tincture of argent which meant it was commonly colored white, but if it was made out of metal, then silver was used. The original meaning of the star was that six main roads crossed in the town of Steinkjer. After the municipal reorganization in 1964, the arms were re-granted, but the meaning was slightly changed. The town of Steinkjer now formed the centre of the municipality and the points were directed to the six other districts (former municipalities) in the new, large Steinkjer Municipality. The six districts were Beitstad, Egge, Kvam, Ogndal, Sparbu, and Stod. The arms were designed by Hallvard Trætteberg. The municipal flag had the same design as the coat of arms.

Churches
The Church of Norway has nine parishes within the municipality of Steinkjer. It is part of the Nord-Innherad prosti (deanery) in the Diocese of Nidaros.

History

The Steinkjer area has been populated since the Stone Age, as shown by the Bølareinen rock carving, which depicts an almost life-sized reindeer and a bear. There are other rock carvings in the area as well, as in Bardal, the oldest up to 6,000 years old.

The Steinkjer area was one of the strongest powerbases in early Viking Age. Mære was one of the best known Norse religious places with sacrifices and seasonal gatherings before Christianity came to Norway.

Steinkjer has survived two major disasters in modern history. The first was a town-wide fire in the year 1900, which burned down much of the southern parts of the town. The second disaster happened on 21 and 22 April 1940, when the town was struck by Luftwaffe bombers during the Norwegian Campaign. Most of the town was destroyed, but no people died.

The attack destroyed a large part of Steinkjer, and many priceless historical buildings, such as the old, cruciform Steinkjer Church were lost. The town was, however, quickly rebuilt after 1945 with much aid from the United States. Much of the architecture of modern Steinkjer originates from the 1950s and 1960s with architecture inspired by functionalism rather than the aestheticism of the earlier Art Nouveau style to be seen in such cities as Trondheim and Ålesund. A few historical buildings – for example, the railway station and the town's college – survived the bombing. These are buildings based on the neoclassical architectural style known as Jugendstil. Good examples are the aforementioned railway station (jernbanestasjonen) and the administration building of Nord-Trøndelag University College.

Government
All municipalities in Norway, including Steinkjer, are responsible for primary education (through 10th grade), outpatient health services, senior citizen services, unemployment and other social services, zoning, economic development, and municipal roads. The municipality is governed by a municipal council of elected representatives, which in turn elect a mayor.  The municipality falls under the Trøndelag District Court and the Frostating Court of Appeal.

Municipal council
The municipal council of Steinkjer is made up of 47 representatives that are elected to four year terms. The party breakdown of the council is as follows:

Mayors
The mayors of Steinkjer:

1857–1860: Johan Fredrik Jenssen 
1861–1863: Sivert Malmo
1864–1867: Adolf Volqvartz Schrøder 
1868–1874: Georg Christian Andersen 
1875–1877: Nils Jacob Laache 
1878–1879: Johan Wilhelm Klüver 
1880–1881: Nicolay Martens 
1882–1882: Claus Urbye
1883–1885: Nicolay Martens (V)
1886-1886: Johannes Rognaas (V)
1887–1890: Nicolay Martens (V/MV)
1891–1893: Mikael Andresen Elstad (V)
1894–1895: Eigil Steen (H)
1896–1897: Ole H. Grindberg (H)
1898–1901: Eigil Steen (H)
1902–1903: Andreas S. Oksvold (V)
1904-1904: Lars Solem (H)
1905-1905: Mikael Andresen Elstad (MV)
1906-1906: Tøger Hagemann (V)
1907-1907: Carl Julius Norstrøm 
1908-1908: Lars Bach (V)
1909–1913: Asmund Schiefloe (V)
1914–1916: Amund Wendelbo (V)
1917-1917: Asmund Schiefloe (V)
1918-1918: Kristian Bragstad (H)
1919-1920: Amund Wendelbo (V)
1920-1921: Kristian Hegstad (V)
1921–1924: Rolf Hanssen (H)
1925–1927: Gustav R. Strugstad (V)
1928–1930: Adolf Ribsskog (V)
1931–1936: Andreas Strand (V)
1937–1939: Olav Hougen (V)
1939–1941: Arne Gausen (V)
1942–1945: Christian Bruseth (NS)
1945-1945: Arne Gausen (V)
1946–1951: Alf Sjursen (Ap)
1952–1963: Åmunn Solberg (Ap)
1964–1967: Karl Dahl (Ap)
1968–1973: Knut Aas (Sp)
1974–1981: Bård Rannem (Sp)
1982–1989: Erik Bartnes (Sp)
1990–1991: Erling Aune (Ap)
1992–1999: Kristian Wibe (Sp)
1999-2007: Per Sverre Rannem (Ap)
2007-2019: Bjørn Arild Gram (Sp)
2019–present: Anne Berit Lein (Sp)

Geography
Steinkjer is located at the head of Beitstadfjorden, the northern branch of the Trondheimsfjord system. To the west, the municipality borders Åfjord and Namsos. To the east is Sweden,  from Steinkjer. To the north are the Snåsa and Overhalla municipalities, and to the south are the Indre Fosen, Inderøy and Verdal municipalities.

The longest cable-stayed bridge in Norway, Skarnsund Bridge, crosses the Skarnsund (total length of ). Large ships pass through Skarnsundet and this allows tourists to visit this town by ship. The landscape is dotted with wavy hills and dense spruce forests, as well as agricultural fields in the lowland areas. There are many lakes in this region including: Gilten, Fossemvatnet, Leksdalsvatnet, Mokkavatnet, Snåsavatnet, and the group of lakes called Bangsjøene.

Natural resources
Steinkjer is one of Norway's larger urban municipalities measured by total area. Approximately half the population lives near the town center, while the rest live in rural areas. However, much of the town is today in the process of urbanization, with the building of several apartment blocks in or within the immediate vicinity of the town. Currently, about 500 apartments are being finished.

Steinkjer is one of the northernmost areas with rich agriculture, allowing large production of grain. It is obvious from the landscape that Steinkjer is a typical agricultural municipality. In addition, there are large forest resources in the immediate area. Kirknesvaag Sag & Høvleri is a large wood mill and industry park producing wood planks and treehouse module components. Almost half of the inner town area consists of the large industrial park for wood products. Most of the ship traffic is related to transportation of the vast forest resources present in Nord-Trøndelag such as timber and cellulose. An important tree species is Norway Spruce.

Climate
Steinkjer has a Humid continental climate, but with some oceanic features, such as relatively mild winters, and a winter month (December) being the wettest. Steinkjer has a relatively sheltered location, and is often the warmest town in summer in Trøndelag. In July 2014, the weather station at Mære in Steinkjer recorded monthly mean temperature  and average daily high , the warmest month recorded in Trøndelag. Further north from Steinkjer, geographical distances between cities grow. The climate of Steinkjer marks a border with the colder conditions typical of inland areas further north. The all-time high  was recorded 16 July 2018, and the record low  on 6 January 2010.

Birdlife
Steinkjer, with its varied habitats, provides the local birdlife with some of the best localities within the region. One of these is Lake Lømsen with its breeding population of Slavonian grebe. The surrounding woodlands and farmlands hold a host of the commoner Scandinavian species, some, like fieldfare and redwing, can be found in good numbers.

Forests and other habitats
The municipality of Steinkjer includes lowland forests, alpine forests, as well as areas above the treeline. A part of Blåfjella-Skjækerfjella National Park is located in the municipality. Byahalla, the most northerly deciduous temperate forest (hemiboreal) location in the world, with species such as wych elm, hazel, hepatica, hedge woundwort, and garlic mustard, is located in Steinkjer, probably due to the sheltered south facing location and the good soil resulting from marine deposits. Some moist locations with spruce forests are classified as boreal rainforests and are part of the Scandinavian coastal conifer forests. The shallow river estuaries in the inner part of the Trondheimsfjord have some of the richest bird life in Norway; thousands of migratory birds feed here. Part of Snåsavatnet, the 6th largest lake in Norway, is located in the municipality, and the river from the lake meets the fjord in the town of Steinkjer.

Transportation
The Sneppen Bridge is part of the E6 in the town of Steinkjer, crossing Steinkjerelva river. Norwegian County Road 17 begins in Steinkjer and heads north. This highway is often referred to as the Coastal highway, whereas the E6 runs further inland to the north.

Steinkjer is the home of the oldest network arch bridge in the world opened to traffic 1964. The bridge is 94 m long and takes the Nedre Mølleveg over Steinkjerelva river.

The municipality is situated along the Nordland Line from Trondheim, and is served by Steinkjer Station and Sparbu Station.

Culture

Steinkjer also has a rich culture and hosts one of the most prominent music cultures in central Norway. Steinkjer is also labeled "Steinkjer Punkrock town" by some of its citizens. The music festival Steinkjerfestivalen was established in 2006. Steinkjermartnan, held each year in August, is a happening where trading booths are staged in the town centre's streets and a traditional trade festival with concerts are held.

Steinkjer has the standard cultural facilities like a cinema, town library, culture house (in which many cultural events and concerts are held), and a modern swimming pool called Dampsaga Bad.

Education
Steinkjer houses the administration and Faculty of Society, Commerce, and Nature of Nord-Trøndelag University College. Important studies include the School of Forestry. Historically, Steinkjer has produced a higher than average amount of university students. Only 25% of the students return to Steinkjer. Steinkjer is therefore a municipality that produces many people with higher education students. 'upbringing municipalities').

Notable people

Public Service 

 Peder Hersleb (1689 in Steinkjer – 1757) a Norwegian-Danish clergyman and Bishop of Oslo and Bishop of Zealand
 Fredrikke Marie Qvam (1843–1938) a humanitarian leader, feminist, liberal politician and wife of Prime Minister Ole Anton Qvam; lived in the manor Helge-By-Rein in Steinkjer from 1849
 Ole Olsen Five (1846 in Stod – 1930) a Norwegian teacher and politician 
 Otto Sverdrup (1854–1930) a sailor and Arctic explorer, moved to Steinkjer in 1877
 Ivar Asbjørn Følling (1888 at Kvam – 1973) physician and biochemist, wrote first scientific description of Følling's disease Phenylketonuria 
 Gustav Aarestrup (1916 in Steinkjer – 2005) a jurist and businessperson, CEO of Storebrand
 Erling Selvig (born 1931 in Egge) a Norwegian legal scholar and judge
 I. H. Monrad Aas (born 1948 in Steinkjer) a public health researcher and odontologist
 Olaug Svarva (born 1957 in Steinkjer) a financial analyst, former CEO of the Government Pension Fund – Norway
 Bjørn Arild Gram (born 1972 in Steinkjer) a Norwegian politician, Mayor of Steinkjer since 2007

The Arts 

 Emil Knudsen (1872 in Steinkjer – 1956) a psychic 
 Jakob Weidemann (1923 in Steinkjer – 2001) an Abstract expressionism artist
 John Pål Inderberg (born 1950 in Steinkjer) a versatile jazz saxophonist
 Silje Nergaard (born 1966 in Steinkjer) a Norwegian jazz vocalist and songwriter
 Øyvind Brandtsegg (born 1971 in Steinkjer) jazz musician, plays percussion and electronica
 Stian Westerhus (born 1979 in Jådåren) a Norwegian experimental style guitarist
 Ida Jenshus (born 1987 in Steinkjer) a country music singer
 Joakim With Steen (born 1989) stage name Jowst, a music producer and songwriter, brought up in Steinkjer
 Victor Sotberg (born 1991) YouTuber, video producer, TV-host. Participated in 'Skal vi danse' in 2020, and the Norwegian version of 'The Masked Singer' in 2021. Victor was brought up in Egge, Steinkjer.

Sports 

 Kristian Fjerdingen (1884 in Steinkjer – 1975) a gymnast and team gold medallist at the 1906 Summer Olympics
 Carl Klæth (1887 in Steinkjer – 1966) & John Skrataas (1890 in Egge – 1961) gymnasts, team silver medallists at the 1908 Summer Olympics
 Gunnar Dybwad (1928 in Steinkjer – 2012) a footballer with 27 caps for Norway 
 Terje Langli (born 1965 in Steinkjer) a cross-country skier, bronze and gold team medallist at the 1992 Winter Olympics, as well as world champion
 Anders Bardal (born 1982 in Steinkjer) ski jumper, twice bronze medallist in the 2010 and 2014 Winter Olympics, as well as 2013 World Champion
 Rune Ertsås (born 1987 in Steinkjer) a retired footballer with over 270 club caps
 Bendik Bye (born 1990 in Steinkjer) a Norwegian footballer with over 340 club caps

References

External links

Municipal fact sheet from Statistics Norway 
 Dampsaga Culture House - houses public library, concert hall and cinema of Steinkjer  
 Steinkjer2007.no  
 Steinkjer.net - recent news about commerce and business in Steinkjer  
 Webcameras showing Steinkjer  
 Steinkjerx.net - A database with articles and pictures about Steinkjer

 
Municipalities of Trøndelag
1858 establishments in Norway